Lenox Avenue is a series of ten orchestral episodes and a finale composed in 1937 by American composer William Grant Still. The composition is for orchestra, chorus and announcer; the narration was written by Verna Arvey, wife of composer Still. The first performance was broadcast nationally on radio on May 23, 1937, conducted by Howard Barlow. A related ballet version was composed in 1938, and is about twenty-one minutes long.

Overview
Lenox Avenue is the primary north–south route through Harlem in the upper portion of the New York City borough of Manhattan, and was the heart of Harlem during the Harlem Renaissance in the 1930s. In 1932, Harlem had been firmly established as the world capital of jazz and African-American culture. Jazz flourished and grew on Lenox Avenue, and is thought by some to be one of the most important streets in the world for African American culture.

Still had composed the orchestral version of Lenox Avenue based on experiences he witnessed in Harlem. The composition, consisting of ten episodes and a finale, was commissioned by the Columbia Broadcasting System and was first conducted in a national broadcast by Howard Barlow on May 23, 1937, and repeated on October 17, 1937. Later, Still conducted it many other times in concert. The later ballet version was first presented by the Dance Theatre Group in Los Angeles in May 1938 with Norma Gould as the choreographer and Charles Teske as the lead dancer.

The origin of the ballet, according to the composer's wife, Verna Arvey, was described as follows:

Film historian Tony Thomas describes the work as "fusing drama with spiritual-like chants and jazz idioms, Lenox Avenue is pure Americana and one that had great influence.

Sections
Set in Harlem in the mid-1930s, the score is marked into sections:
The Crap Game
The Flirtation
The Fight
The Law
Dance of the Boys
Dance of the Man Down South
The Old Man (The Philosopher)
The Mission
The House Rent Party (includes "Blues")
The Orator
Finale

See also
 List of ballets by title
 List of jazz-influenced classical compositions

References

Further reading

External links
 
 

Compositions by William Grant Still
Orchestral suites
1937 compositions
1938 ballet premieres